Annie Griffin (born 1960) is an American writer and director.

Born in New York City, Griffin relocated to the United Kingdom in 1981. She started out as an experimental theatre writer and director in the 1980s, with her first notable work being Blackbeard the Pirate in 1987, at the ICA in London. In the early 1990s she worked creating animated idents for MTV. In 1993 she worked as an actress on the Oscar nominated short animated film The Village. Through the 1990s she worked on a number of short works including the Seven Sins:Wrath which featured Paul Kaye and David Walliams.

In 1999, Griffin wrote and directed Coming Soon.

Griffin wrote and directed The Book Group, a comedy drama which aired on Channel 4 in the United Kingdom between 2002 and 2003, and ran for two series. It was the winner of two BAFTA Scotland awards.

In 2005, Griffin wrote and directed Festival a black comedy set during the Edinburgh Festival Fringe.

In 2011, Griffin directed two episodes of Channel 4 comedy-drama series Fresh Meat. When the series returned in 2012, she directed episodes five to eight, and also wrote episode six.

References

External links
 Annie Griffin Production Company site
 

1960 births
American women film directors
American emigrants to the United Kingdom
Screenwriters from New York (state)
American television directors
Television producers from New York City
American women television producers
American television writers
American film actresses
British film directors
British screenwriters
British television directors
British television producers
British women television producers
British television writers
American women television directors
Living people
Writers from Glasgow
Writers from New York City
American women screenwriters
American women television writers
British dramatists and playwrights
American women dramatists and playwrights
Film directors from New York City
British women television writers